Corporación Nuevo Arco Iris (New Rainbow Corporation) is a non-governmental organization in Colombia.

Overview
The Rainbow Corporation was created in 1994 as part of an agreement between the Colombian government and Corriente de Renovación Socialista. It supports the modernization and democratization of Colombia through peace and development of education, health, housing, employment and further economic initiatives.

Its president is León Valencia. Boardmembers include Antonio Sanguino, Rodrigo Osorno. Most members are former Marxist rebels, notably from the National Liberation Army. Fifteen employees have been killed in recent years. The organization is protected by 40 bodyguards. It has 200 employees, 115 of whom are former rebels. It is funded by Spain the Netherlands, the European community, the United Nations Development Program, etc., with a budget of half a million dollars. U.S. Ambassador William Brownfield has expressed moral support for the organization.

Its headquarters are in Bogota, Colombia.

References

External links
Official website

Political organisations based in Colombia